The Trabant is an East German automobile.

Trabant may also refer to:

 Trabant (military), a life guard and servant of the Middle Ages and Early Modern Period
 Trabant (band), an Icelandic band
 Trabant (Hungarian band), a 1980s group
 Wipeout (ride) or Trabant, an amusement ride
 Hildegard Trabant (1927–1964), victim of the Berlin Wall

See also
 Trabantenstadt, German for commuter town